Gangsås or Gansås is a part of the town of Harstad within Harstad Municipality in Troms county, Norway.  It is situated on the southern and western sides of a small peninsula southeast of the city center. The main neighbourhoods are Vollen (inhabited since 1975) and Øvre Gangsås (Upper Gangsås) (established in the 1980s).

Gangsås is bounded by Stangnes to the east, Åsby and Kanebogen to the south, and Vågsfjorden to the northwest.

Gangsåstoppen
The ending ås in Gangsås means hill, and the top of the hill is called Gangsåstoppen. To the east one sees the island of Rolla and the mainland, to the south is the Tjeldsundet strait, and to the north are the islands of Grytøya and Senja.

A marked path leads to Gangsåstoppen from the car park at the end of the Toppenveien road. The trip takes about 20 minutes, and there is a mail box at the top where one may sign the guest book.

Industry
At the western foot of the hill is Mercur; some people live there, but the area is mostly industrialized, not least by Statoil.

Media gallery

References

Harstad